Großniedesheim is a municipality in the Rhein-Pfalz-Kreis, in Rhineland-Palatinate, Germany.

Politics

Municipal Council

Mayor 
The mayor of Großniedesheim is Michael Walther (SPD).

References

Rhein-Pfalz-Kreis